The 2018–18 DePaul Blue Demons women's basketball team represented DePaul University during the 2018–19 NCAA Division I women's basketball season. The Blue Demons, led by thirty-third year head coach Doug Bruno, played their home games at the Wintrust Arena as members of the Big East Conference. They finished the season 26–8, 14–4 in Big East play to finish in second place. DePaul won the Big East Conference tournament championship game over Marquette, 74–73. They were upset in the first round by Missouri State in the NCAA women's tournament.

Previous season
The Blue Demons finished the 2017–18 season 27–8, 15–3 in Big East play to share the Big East regular season title with Marquette. They won the Big East women's tournament by defeating Marquette in the championship game. They received an automatic bid to the NCAA women's tournament where they defeated Oklahoma in the first round before losing to Texas A&M in the second round.

Roster

Schedule

|-
!colspan=9 style=| Exhibition

|-
!colspan=9 style=| Non-conference regular season

|-
!colspan=9 style=| Big East regular season

|-
!colspan=9 style=| Big East Women's Tournament

|-
!colspan=9 style=| NCAA Women's Tournament

Rankings

^Coaches' Poll did not release a second poll at the same time as the AP.

See also
2018–19 DePaul Blue Demons men's basketball team

References

DePaul
DePaul Blue Demons women's basketball seasons
Depaul
Depaul
DePaul